This list includes Italian American mobsters and organized crime figures that operate in the United States, both past and present.

A
Joseph Abate, "Joe" (1902–1994)
Frank Abbandando, "The Dasher" (1910–1942)
Frank Abbatemarco, "Frankie Shots" (1899–1959)
Philip Abramo, "The King of Wall Street" (Born 1945)
Settimo Accardi, "Big Sam" (1902–1977)
Tony Accardo, "Joe Batters", "Big Tuna" (born Antonino Leonardo Accardo, 1906–1992)
Anthony Accetturo, "Tumac" (born 1938)
Momo Adamo (1895–1956)
Carmine Agnello (born 1960)
Thomas Agro, "T.A.", "Tipp", "Thomas Ambrosiano" (1931–1987)
Joe Aiello (1890–1930)
Joey Aiuppa, "Joey Doves", "Joey O'Brien" (1907–1997)
Felix Alderisio, "Milwaukee Phil" (1912–1971)
Harry Aleman, "The Hook" (1939–2010)
Vincent Alo, "Jimmy Blue Eyes" (1904–2001)
Benedetto Aloi, "Benny" (1935–2011)
Vincenzo Aloi, "Vinny" (born 1933)
William Aloisio, "Smokes" (1906–1979)
Willie Altieri, "Two-Knife" (1891–1970)
Giacomo Amari, "Jake" (died 1997)
Frank Amato (died 1980/1985)
Samuzzo Amatuna, "Samuel", "Samoots" (1898–1925)
Victor Amuso, "Little Vic", "The Terminator" (born 1934)
Albert Anastasia, "Mad Hatter", "Lord High Executioner" (born Umberto Anastasio, 1902–1957)
Anthony Anastasio, "Tough Tony" (born Antonio Anastasio, 1906–1963)
Thomas Andretta (1938–2019)
Joseph Andriacchi, "Joe the Builder" (born 1932)
Donald Angelini, "The Wizard of Odds" (1926–2000)
Donato Angiulo, "Danny", "Laughing Fox" (1923–2009)
Francesco Angiulo, "Frank" "Frankie the Cat" (1921–2015)
James Angiulo, "Jimmy Jones" (1939–2014)
Gennaro Angiulo, "Jerry" (1919–2009)
Anthony Antico, "Tico" (born 1945)
Ignacio Antinori (born Ignazio Pizzuto Antinoro, 1885–1940)
John Ardito, "Buster" (1919–2006)
Joe Adonis, "Joey A.", "Joe Adone" (born Giuseppe Antonio Doto, 1902–1971)
Joseph Ardizzone, "Iron Man" (born Giuseppe Ernesto Ardizzone, 1884–1931)
Joseph Armone, "Joe Piney" (1917–1992)
Stephen Armone, "14th Street Steve" (1899–1960)
Vincent Asaro, "Vinnie" (born 1935)
Louis Attanasio, "Louie Ha Ha" (born 1944)
Alphonse Attardi, "The Peacemaker" (1892–1970)
Salvatore Avellino, "Sal", "The Golfer" (born 1935)

B
Frank Balistrieri, "Frankie Bal", "Mr. Big" (1918-1993)
Anthony Baratta, "Bowat" (born 1938)
Joseph Barbara, "Joe the Barber" (born Giuseppe Maria Barbara, 1905–1959)
John Barbato, "Johnny Sausage" (born 1934)
Vincent Basciano, "Vinny Gorgeous" (born 1959)
Sam Battaglia, "Teets" (1908–1973)
James Belcastro, "Mad Bomber" (1895–1945)
Liborio Bellomo, "Barney" (born 1957)
Nicholas Bianco, "Nicky" (1932–1994)
Anthony J. Biase (1909–1991)
Thomas Bilotti, "The Wig","The Toupee", "The Doberman", "Zombie Bilotti", "The Pitbull", "Tommy" (1940–1985)
Charles Binaggio, "Charlie" (1909–1950)
Joseph Biondo, "Joe Bandy", "Joe the Blonde", "Little Rabbit" (born Giuseppe Biondo, 1897–1966)
Attilio Bitondo, "Tillio" (born 1928)
Ferdinand Boccia, "The Shadow" (1900–1934)
Richard Boiardo, "Richie the Boot" (1890–1984)
Frank Bompensiero, "Frankie Bomp" (1905–1977)
Joseph Bonanno, "Joe Bananas", "Don Peppino" (born Giuseppe Carlo Bonanno, 1905–2002) 
Salvatore Bonanno, "Bill" (1932–2008)
Cesare Bonventre, "The Tall Guy" (1951–1984)
Giovanni Bonventre, "John" (1901–1970)
Vito Bonventre (1875–1930)
Rosario Borgio (1861–1919)
Bartholomew Boriello, "Bobby" (1944–1991)
Anthony Brancato (1914–1951)
Dominic Brooklier, "Jimmy Regace" (born Domenico Brucceleri, 1914–1984)
Salvatore Briguglio, "Sally Bugs" (1930-1978)
Adolfo Bruno, "Al" (1945–2003)
Angelo Bruno, "The Gentle Don" (born Angelo Annaloro, 1910–1980)
Fiore Buccieri, "Fifi" (1907–1973)
Frank Buccieri, "The Horse", "Frank Russo", "Big Frank" (1919–2004)
Russell Bufalino, "McGee", "The Old Man" (born Rosario Alberto Bufalino, 1903–1994)

C
Joel Cacace, "Joe Waverly" (born 1941)
Thomas Cacciopoli, "Tommy Sneakers", "Cacci" (born 1949)
Jimmy Caci (1925–2011)
Vincent Cafaro, "Fish" (born 1933)
Marshall Joseph Caifano (born Marcello Giuseppe Caifano, 1911–2003)
Frank Calabrese Sr., "Frankie Breeze", "The Breeze" (1937–2012)
Nicholas Calabrese (born 1942)
Frank Cali, "Franky Boy" (1965–2019)
William Cammisano, "Willie the Rat" (1914–1995)
Louis Campagna, "Little New York" (1900–1955)
Joseph Cantalupo, "Joey" (born 1943)
Richard Cantarella, "Shellackhead" (born 1944)
Dominick Canterino, "Baldy Dom" (1929–1990)
Anthony Capo, "Tony" (1959–2012)
Al Capone, "Scarface", "Big Al", "Al Brown" (1899–1947)
Frank Capone (1895–1924)
Louis Capone (1896–1944)
Ralph Capone, "Bottles" (born Raffaele James Capone, 1894–1974)
Antonio Caponigro, "Tony Bananas" (1912–1980)
Frankie Carbo, "Frank Tucker", "Mr. Fury", "Mr. Gray" (born Paolo Giovanni Carbo, 1904–1976)
Anthony J. Cardarella, "Tiger" (1926–1984)
Sam Cardinelli (born Salvatore Cardinella, 1869–1921)
Anthony Carfano, "Little Augie Pisano" (1895–1959)
Joseph Caridi, "Joe C" (born 1949)
Sam Carlisi, "Black Sam", "Wings" (1914–1997)
Charles Carneglia (born 1946)
John Carneglia, "Johnny Carnegs" (born 1945)
Sylvestro Carolla, "Silver Dollar Sam" (1896–1972)
Charles Carrollo, "Charlie the Wop" (born Vincenzo Carrollo, 1902–1979)
Frank Carrone, "Buzz", "Buzzy" (1938–1975)
Robert F. Carrozza, "Bobby Russo" (born 1940)
Frank T. Caruso, "Skids" (1911–1983)
Primo Cassarino (born 1956)
Anthony Casso, "Gaspipe" (1942–2020)
Paul Castellano, "Big Paul" (1915–1985)
Richard Castucci, "Ritchie" (1928–1976)
Salvatore Catalanotte, "Sam Sings in the Night" (born Salvatore Catalanotto, 1883–1930)
Dominick Cataldo, "Little Dom" (1923–1997)
Gerardo Catena, "Jerry" (1902–2000)
Domenico Cefalù, "Italian Dom" (born 1947)
Dino Cellini (1924–1978)
Anthony Centracchio (1929–2001)
Jackie Cerone, "Jackie the Lackey" (1914–1996)
Peter Chiodo, "Fat Pete" (1951–2016)
Anthony Ciccone, "Sonny" (born 1934)
Nicholas Ciotti, "Buddy" (1944–2003)
Dominick Cirillo, "Quiet Dom" (born 1929)
Frank Cirofici, "Frank Murato", "Dago Frank" (1887–1914)
Anthony Civella, "Tony Ripe" (1929–2006)
Carl Civella, "Corky" (1910–1994)
Nicholas Civella, "Nick" (born Giuseppe Nicoli Civella, 1912–1983)
Joseph Civello  (1902–1970)
Michael Clemente, "Mike Costello", "Big Mike" (1908–1987)
Frank Colacurcio (1917–2010)
Ettore Coco, "Eddie" (1908–1991)
Eco James Coli (1922–1982)
Joseph Colombo, "Joe" (1923–1978)
Big Jim Colosimo, "Diamond Jim" (born Vincenzo Colosimo, 1878–1920)
Louis Consalvo, "Louie Eggs" (born 1958)
Pasquale Conte, "Patty", "Patsy" (1925–2017)
Frank Coppa, "Big Frank" (born 1941)
Frank Coppola, "Frank Three Fingers" (born Francesco Paolo Coppola, 1899–1982)
Michael Coppola, "Trigger Mike" (1900–1966)
Mikey Coppola, "Mikey Cigars" (born 1946)
Anthony Corallo, "Tony Ducks" (1913–2000)
Anthony Cornero, "Admiral", "Tony the Hat" (born Antonio Cornero Stralla, 1899–1955)
Joseph Corozzo, "Jo Jo" (born 1942)
Nicholas Corozzo, "Little Nicky" (born 1949)
Samuel Corsaro, "Little Sammy" (1943–2002)
Dominic Cortina (1925–1999)
James Cosmano, "Sunny Jim" (born Vincenzo Cosmano, 1885–1943)
Frank Costello, "The Prime Minister" (born Francesco Castiglia, 1891–1973)
Steven Crea, "Stevie Wonder", "Herbie" (born 1947)
Perry Criscitelli (born 1950)

Frank Cullotta (born 1938–2020)

Domenico Cutaia, "Danny" (1936–2018)
William Cutolo, "Billy Fingers", "Wild Bill" (born Guglielmo Cutolo, 1949–1999)

D
William Daddano Sr., "William Russo", "Willie Potatoes" (1912–1975)
Louis Daidone, "Louie Bagels" (born 1946)
John D'Amato, "Johnny Boy" (disappeared 1992)
Gaspare D'Amico, "Gaspar" (1886–1975)
Marco D'Amico, "The Mover" (born 1936-2020)
Jackie D'Amico, "Jackie Nose" (born 1937)
Joseph D'Amico (born 1955)
Anthony D'Andrea (born Antonio D'Andrea, 1872–1921)
Ralph Daniello, "The Barber" (born Alfonso Pepe, 1886–1925)
Salvatore D'Aquila, "Toto", "Tata" (1878–1928)
Alphonse D'Arco, "Little Al" (1932–2019)
Michael DeBatt, "Mickey" (1949–1987)
Angelo DeCarlo, "Gyp" (1902–1973)
Sam DeCavalcante, "Sam the Plumber" (1913–1997)
Frank DeCicco, "Frankie D.", "Frankie Cheech" (1935–1986)
George DeCicco, "Butterass" (born 1929)
Joseph DeFede, "Little Joe", "Joe D" (1934–2012)
Peter DeFeo, "Philie Aquilino", "Petey" (1902–1993)
William D'Elia, "Big Billy" (born 1946)
Patrick DeFilippo, "Patty from the Bronx" (1939–2013)
Andrew Thomas DelGiorno, "Tommy Del" (born 1940)
Aniello Dellacroce, "Mr. Neil", "The Lamb" (1914–1985)
Frank Deluca (born Francesco DeLuca, 1898–1967)
Joseph Deluca (born Giuseppe DeLuca, 1893–1952)
Carl DeLuna, "Tuffy" (1927–2008)
Frank DeMayo, "Chee-Chee" (born Franco DeMaio, 1885–1949)
Roy DeMeo (1940–1983)
Lawrence Dentico, "Larry Fab", "Little Larry" (born 1923)
Gregory DePalma (1932–2009)
John DeRoss, "Jackie", "Jackie Zambooka" (born 1937)
Frank DeSimone (1909–1967)
Rosario DeSimone, "The Chief" (1873–1946)
Thomas DeSimone, "Two-Gun Tommy" (1950–1979)
Mario Anthony DeStefano (born Mario Antonio DeStefano, 1915–1975)
Sam DeStefano, "Mad Sam" (1909–1973)
Robert DiBernardo, "DiB" (1937–1986)
Paul DiCocco Sr., "Legs DiCocco" (1924–1989)
John DiFronzo (1928–2018)
Peter DiFronzo (born 1933)
Sebastiano DiGaetano (1862–1912)
Vito Di Giorgio (1880–1922)
John DiGilio, "Johnny Dee" (1932–1988)
Michael DiLeonardo, "Mickey Scars" (born 1955)
Leonard DiMaria, "Lenny" (born 1941)
Joseph DiNapoli, "Joey D.", "Joey Dee" (born 1935)
Louis DiNapoli, "Louie D." (born 1938)
Vincent DiNapoli, "Vinny D." (1937–2005)
Frederick DiNome (1935–1986)
Richard DiNome, "Richie" (1954–1984)
Jackie DiNorscio (1940–2004)
Rocco DiSiglio, "Rocky" (1939–1966)
Rosario Dispenza (died 1914)
Johnny Dio (1914–1979)
Joseph Dippolito, "Joe Dip" (1914–1974)
Joseph DiVarco, "Little Caesar" (1911–1986)
Jack Dragna, "Capone of Los Angeles" (born Ignazio Dragna, 1891–1956)
Tom Dragna (born Gaetano Dragna, 1889–1977)
Louis Tom Dragna, "The Reluctant Prince" (1920–2012)
Vincent Drucci, "Schemer" (born Victor D'Ambrosio, 1898–1927)

E
Thomas Eboli, "Tommy Ryan" (born Tommaso Eboli, 1911–1972)
Alfred Embarrato, "Al Walker" (1909–2001)
Joe Esposito, "Diamond Joe" (born Giuseppe Esposito, 1872–1928)
Natale Evola, "Joe Diamond" (1907–1973)

F
Albert Facchiano, "Chinky", "The Old Man" (1910 – 2011)
James Failla, "Jimmy Brown" (1919–1999)
Costabile Farace, "Gus" (1960–1989)
Carmine Fatico, "Charley Wagons" (1910–1991)
Anthony Federici, "Tough Tony" (1940-2022)
Steve Ferrigno (1900–1930)
Louis Ferrante (born 1969)
Theresa Ferrara (1952–1979)
Vincent M. Ferrara, "The Animal" (born 1949)
Joseph Ferriola, "Oscar", "Joe Nagall" (1927–1989)
Ray Ferritto (1929–2004)
Vito Cascio Ferro (1862–1943)
Anthony Fiato, "The Animal", "Tony Rome" (born 1949)
Charles Fischetti, "Trigger Happy", "The Fixer" (1891–1951)
Rocco Fischetti, "Rocky", "Ralph Fisher" (1903–1964)
Tino Fiumara, "T", "The Greek", "George Greco" (1941–2010)
Stephen Flemmi, "The Rifleman" (born 1934)
Vincent Flemmi, "Jimmy The Bear", "Vinnie the Butcher" (1935–1979)
John Franzese, "Sonny" (1917–2020)
John Franzese Jr. (born 1960)
Michael Franzese, "The Yuppie Don" (born 1951)
Christopher Furnari, "Sergio Vieira", "Fuzi" (1924–2018)
Jimmy Fratianno, "The Weasel" (born Aladena Fratianno, 1913–1993)
Louis Fratto, "Lew Farrell", "Cock-Eyed Lou" (born Luigi Tommaso Giuseppe Fratto, 1907–1967)
Rudy Fratto (born 1943)

G
Anthony Gaggi, "Nino" (1925–1988)
Tommy Gagliano (1883–1951)
Carmine Galante, "The Cigar", "Lilo" (1910–1979)
James Galante (born 1953)
Joseph Galizia, "Joe Glitz" (1941–1998)
Albert Gallo, "Kid Blast", "Al" (born 1930)
Joe Gallo, "Crazy Joe", "Joey the Blond" (1929–1972)
Joseph N. Gallo (1912–1995)
Kenny Gallo, "Kenji" (born 1968)
Giosue Gallucci, "Luccariello", "The King of Little Italy" (1864–1915)
Carlo Gambino, "Don Carlo" (1902–1976)
John Gambino (1942–2017)
Thomas Gambino, "Tommy" (born 1929)
Rosario Gambino, "Sal" (born 1942)
Rosario Gangi, "Ross" (born 1939)
Eddie Garafola, "Cousin Eddie" (born 1939)
Charles Gargotta, "Mad Dog" (1900–1950)
Angelo Genna, "Bloody Angelo" (1898–1925)
Mike Genna, "Mike the Devil" (1895–1925)
Tony Genna, "Tony the Gentleman" (1890–1925)
Vincenzo Genna, "James", "Jim" (1888–1931)
Michael James Genovese, "Mike" (1919–2006)
Vito Genovese, "Don Vitone" (1897–1969)
Nicola Gentile, "Nick", "Zu Cola" (1885–1966)
Anthony Giacalone, "Tony Jack" (1919–2001)
Vito Giacalone, "Billy Jack" (1923–2012)
Philip Giaccone, "Philly Lucky" (1932–1981)
Sam Giancana, "Momo", "Mo", "Mooney", "Sam the Cigar", "Sam Flood" (born Salvatore Giangana, 1908–1975)
Gaetano Gianolla (1880s–)
Mario Gigante (born 1923)
Vincent Gigante, "Chin", "The Oddfather", "Vinny" (1928–2005)
Charles Gioe, "Cherry Nose" (died 1954)
Thomas Gioeli, "Tommy Shots" (born 1952)
Anthony Giordano, "Tony G" (1915–1980)
Joseph Giunta, "Hop Toad" (born Giuseppe Giunta, 1887–1929)
Anthony Gizzo, "Fat Tony" (1902–1953)
Joseph Glimco (born Giuseppe Glielmi, 1909–1991)
Gene Gotti (born 1946)
John Gotti, "Johnny Boy", "The Dapper Don", "The Teflon Don" (1940–2002)
John A. Gotti, "Junior Gotti" (born 1960)
Peter Gotti, "Pete", "One Eye" (1939–2021)
Richard G. Gotti, "Ritchie" (born 1968)
Richard V. Gotti, "Ritchie Jr." (born 1942)
Stephen Grammauta, "Stevie Coogan" (1916–2016)
Sammy Gravano, "Sammy the Bull" (born 1945)
Anthony Graziano, "T.G." (1940–2019)
Edward Grillo, "Danny" (1934–1978)
Francesco Guarraci, "Frank" (1955–2016)
Matthew Guglielmetti, "Matty" (born 1949)

H
Henry Hill (1943–2012)

I
Matthew Ianniello, "Matty the Horse" (1920–2012)
Joseph Iannuzzi, "Joe Dogs" (1931–2015)
James Ida, "Little Guy" (born 1940)
Frank Illiano, "Punchy" (1928–2014)
Nicola Impastato, "Nick Tousa" (1906–1979)
Alphonse Indelicato, "Sonny Red" (1931–1981)
Anthony Indelicato, "Bruno", "Whack-Whack" (born 1956)

J
Ronald Jerothe, "John", "Foxy" (born Ronald Gerote, 1947–1974)
Wilfred Johnson, "Willie Boy" (1935–1988)
Joseph Juliano, "Sonny" (born 1938)

K
Paul Kelly (born Paolo Antonio Vaccarelli, 1876–1936)

L
Gennaro Langella, "Jerry Lang" (1938–2013)
Joseph Lanza, "Socks" (born Giuseppe Lanza, 1901–1968)
Ignatius Lanzetta, "Frank Pius" (1903–)
Leo Lanzetta (1895–1925)
Angelo J. LaPietra, "The Hook" (1920–1999)
James LaPietra, "Jimmy the Lapper" (1927–1993)
 Frank LaPorte, "Frankie"
Louis LaRasso, "Fat Lou" (1926–1991)
John LaRocca, "John La Rock" (1901–1984)
James V. LaSala (1904–?)
Frank Lastorino, "Big Frank" (born 1939)
Peter LaTempa (1904–1945)
Stefano LaTorre (1886–1984)
John Lazia, "Brother John" (1896–1934)
Daniel Leo, "Danny the Lion" (born 1941)
Phil Leonetti, "Crazy Phil" (born 1953)
Paolo LiCastri (1935–1979)
Nick Licata, "Old Man", "Mr. Nick" (born Nicolò Licata, 1897–1974)
James T. Licavoli, "Jack White", "Blackie" (born Vincentio Licavoli, 1904–1985)
Thomas Licavoli, "Yonnie" (1904–1973)
Peter Licavoli, "Horseface" (1902–1984)
Joseph Ligambi, "Uncle Joe" (born 1939)
Frank Lino, "Curly" (born 1938)
Frank LoCascio, "Frankie Loc" (1933–2021)
Peter LoCascio, "Mr. Bread" (1916–1997)
Salvatore LoCascio, "Tori" (born 1959)
Gaetano Lococo, "Thomas", "Tano" (1895–1993)
Pasqualino Lolordo, "Patsy" (1887–1929)
Antonio Lombardo, "The Scourge", "Tony" (1892–1928)
Joseph Lombardo, "Joey the Clown", "Joe Padula", "Lumbo", "Lumpy" (born Giuseppe Lombardi, 1929–2019)
Philip Lombardo, "Benny Squint", "Cockeyed Ben", "Ben" (1908–1987)
Carmine Lombardozzi, "The Doctor" (1913–1992)
Angelo Lonardo, "Big Ange" (1911–2006)
Joseph Lonardo, "Big Joe" (born Giuseppe Lonardo, 1884–1926)
Alan Longo, "Baldie" (born 1950)
Joseph LoPiccolo, "Baldie" (1918–1999)
Anthony Loria Sr., "Tony Aboudamita" (1921–1989)
Joseph Lucchese, "Joe Brown" (born Giuseppe Lucchese, 1910–1987)
Tommy Lucchese, "Three Finger Brown", "Tommy Brown" (born Gaetano Lucchese, 1899–1967)
Lucky Luciano, "Charlie" (born Salvatore Lucania, 1897–1962)
Ignazio Lupo, "Lupo the Wolf", "Ignazio Saietta" (1877–1947)

M
Sam Maceo, "Velvet Glove" (1894–1951)
Rosario Maceo, "Iron Glove", "Papa Rose" (1887–1954)
Matthew Madonna, "Matty" (born 1935)
Peter Magaddino (1917–1976)
Stefano Magaddino, "Don Stefano", "The Undertaker", "The Grand Old Man of La Cosa Nostra" (1891–1974)
Joseph Magliocco, "Joe Malayak", "Fat Joe" (born Giuseppe Magliocco, 1898–1963)
Harry Maione, "Happy" (1908–1942)
Alphonse Malangone, "Allie Shades" (born 1936)
Lawrence Mangano, "Dago" (1892–1944)
Philip Mangano (born Filippo Mangano, 1898–1951)
Venero Mangano, "Benny Eggs" (1921–2017)
Vincent Mangano, "Don Vincenzo" (born Vincenzo Giovanni Mangano, 1888–1951)
Louis Manna, "Bobby" (born 1929)
Lorenzo Mannino, "Lore" (born 1959)
Luigi Manocchio, "Baby Shacks" (born 1927)
Francesco Manzo, "Frankie the Wop", "Frank Manze" (1925–2012)
Salvatore Maranzano, "Little Caesar" (1886–1931)
Carlos Marcello, "The Little Man", "The Godfather" (born Calogero Minacore, 1910–1993)
James Marcello, "Little Jimmy", "Jimmy The Man" (born 1943)
Daniel Marino (born 1940)
Richard Martino, "Ritchie" (born 1961)
James Martorano, "Jimmy" (born 1941)
Johnny Martorano, "Vincent Joseph Rancourt", "Richard O'Coin", "Nick", "The Cook", "The Executioner" (born 1940)
Joseph Masella, "Joey O" (1948–1998)
Joe Masseria, "Joe the Boss" (1886–1931)
Joseph Massino, "Big Joey", "The Ear" (born 1943)
Jack McGurn, "Machine Gun" (born Vincenzo Antonio Gibaldi, 1902–1936)
James McLain, "Revolvers" (born Antonio Tangorello, 1903–1934)
Anthony Megale, "The Genius", "Tony" (1953–2015)
Angelo Meli (1897–1969)
Vincent Meli, "Little Vince" (born Vincenzo Angelo Meli, 1921–2008)
Angelo Mercurio, "Sonny" (1936–2006)
Chuckie Merlino (1939–2012)
Joey Merlino, "Skinny Joe" (born 1962)
Mike Merlo (1880–1924)
Sam Mesi (1900–1971)
Gaspare Messina (1879–1957)
Aniello Migliore, "Neil" (1933–2019)
Anthony Milano, "Old Man Tony" (born Antonio Milano, 1888–1978)
Frank Milano (born Ciccio Milano, 1891–1970)
Carmen Milano, "Flipper" (1929–2006)
Peter Milano (1925–2012)
Gaspar Milazzo, "The Peacemaker" (1887–1930)
Manfredi Mineo, "Alfred", "Al" (1880–1930)
Michele Miranda, "Big Mike" (1896–1973)
Anthony Mirra, "Tony" (1927–1982)
Michael Mancuso, "Mickey Nose", "The Nose" (born 1955)
John C. Montana (born Giovanni Montana, 1893–1964)
Lenny Montana (born Leonardo Passafaro, 1926–1992)
Dominick Montiglio (born Dominick Angelo Santamaria, 1947)
Pellegrino Morano, "Don Pellegrino" (1877–)
Nicholas Morello, "Nick Terranova" (1890–1916)
Giuseppe Morello, "The Clutching Hand", "The Old Fox", "Peter Morello", "Piddu Morello" (1867–1930)
Willie Moretti, "Willie Moore" (1894–1951)
Julie Morrell, "Jules Morello" (died 1911)

N
James Napoli, "Jimmy Nap" (1911–1992)
Dominick Napolitano, "Sonny Black" (1936–1981)
John Nardi (born Giovanni Narcchione, 1916–1977)
Charles Nicoletti, "Chuckie", "The Typewriter" (1916–1977)
Ralph Natale (born 1935)
Frank Nitti, "The Enforcer" (born Francesco Raffaele Nitto, 1886–1943)

O
Victor Orena, "Little Vic" (born 1934)

P
Pasquale Parrello, "Patsy" (born 1944)
Daniel Pagano, "Danny" (born 1953)
Joseph Luco Pagano (1928–1989)
Frank Palermo, "Blinky" (1905–1996)
Girolamo Palermo, "Jimmy Dumps" (1938-2014)
Vincent Palermo, "Vinny Ocean" (born 1944)
Charles Panarella, "Charlie Moose" (1925–2017)
Raymond L. S. Patriarca, "The Man", "Ray" (1908–1984)
Raymond Patriarca Jr., "Ray Jr.", "Junior Patriarca" (born 1945)
Johnny Papalia, "Johnny Pops Papalia", "The Enforcer" (1924–1997)
Anthony Peraino, "Big Tony" (1915–1991)
Robert Perrino, "Bobby" (1934–1992)
Alphonse Persico, "Little Allie Boy", "Allie Boy" (born 1951)
Carmine Persico, "The Snake", "Junior" (1933–2019)
Tomasso Petto, "The Ox" (1879–1905)
Frank Piccolo, "Pic", "Frank Lanza" (1921–1981)
Joseph Pinzolo, "Fat Joe" (1887–1930)
Louis Pioggi, "Louis Poggi", "Louie the Lump" (1889–1969)
Thomas Pitera, "Tommy Karate" (born 1954)
Dominick Pizzonia, "Skinny Dom" (born 1941)
Alfred Polizzi, "Big Al" (born Alfonso Polizzi, 1900–1975)
Frank Polizzi (1936–2001)
Ross Prio (born Rosario Priolo, 1901–1972)
Angelo Prisco, "The Horn" (1917–2017)
Joe Profaci, "The Old Man", "Don Peppino" (1897–1962)
Anthony Provenzano, "Tony Pro" (1917–1988)
Nunzio Provenzano, "Nunzi Pro" (1923–1997)

R
Rocco Racco (1868–1909)
Joseph Rao, "Joseph Cangro", "Tough Joey" (1901–1962)
Vincenzo Rao, "Vincent" (1898–1988)
Philip Rastelli, "Rusty" (1918–1991)
Marco Reginelli, "Little Man", "Small Man" (1897–1956)
Gaetano Reina, "Tommy", "Tom" (1889–1930)
George Remini, "Fat Georgie", "Big George" (1929–2007)
Paul Ricca, "The Waiter" (born Felice DeLucia, 1897–1972)
Lawrence Ricci, "Larry" (1945–2005)
Louis Ricco, "Louie Bracciole" (born 1929)
Harry Riccobene, "Harry the Hump", "The Hunchback" (1909–2000)
Mario Riccobene, "Sonny" (1933–1993)
Giovanni Riggi, "John the Eagle" (1925–2015)
Frank Rio, "Frank Cline" (1895–1935)
Michael Rizzitello, "Mike Rizzi" (1927–2005)
Carmine Romano, "Fish" (1935–2011)
John Roselli, "Handsome Johnny", "John Rosselli", "John F. Stewart" (born Filippo Sacco, 1905–1976)
Benjamin Ruggiero, "Lefty", "Lefty Guns", "Lefty Two Guns" (1923–1995)
Angelo Ruggiero, "Quack Quack" (1940–1989)
Anthony Russo, "Chucky", "Little Pussy" (1916–1979)

S
Michael Sabella, "Mimi" (1911–1989)
Salvatore Sabella (1891–1962)
Frank Salemme, "Cadillac Frank", "Julian Daniel Selig" (born 1933)
Anthony Salerno, "Fat Tony" (1911–1992)
Rudolph Santobello, "Rudy" (1928–2013)
Nicholas Santora, "Nicky Mouth" (1942–2018)
Saverio Santora, "Sammy" (1935–1987)
Anthony Santorelli, "Blue Eyes" (born 1946)
Salvatore Santoro, "Tom Mix" (1915–2000)
Michael Sarno, "Fat Boy", "The Fat Guy", "Big Mike", "The Big Guy" (born 1958)
Salvatore Scala, "Fat Sally" (1944–2008)
Frank Scalice, "Don Ciccio", "Don Cheech" (born Francesco Scalice, 1893–1957)
John Scalise (born Giovanni Scalise, 1900–1929)
Joseph Scalise, "Jerry" (born 1937)
John T. Scalish (1912–1976)
Frank Scarabino, "Franky the Beast" (born 1956)
Nicodemo Scarfo, "Little Nicky" (1929–2017)
Nicky Scarfo Jr., "Nicky Junior" (born 1965)
Gregory Scarpa, "The Grim Reaper" (1928–1994)
Gregory Scarpa Jr. (born 1951)
Gerald Scarpelli (1938–1989)
Giuseppe Schifilliti, "Pino" (born 1938)
Nicolo Schiro, "Cola" (born Nicolò Schirò, 1872–1957)
Paul Sciacca (1909–1986)
Edward Sciandra, "Eddie The Conductor" (1912–2003)
Carmine Sciandra (born 1952)
John Sciandra, "Johnny" (1899–1940)
Gerlando Sciascia, "George from Canada" (1934–1999)
Nicholas Scibetta, "Little Nicky" (died 1978)
Onofrio Sciortino (1891–1959)
Augustus Sclafani, "Big Gus" (died 1986)
Ralph Scopo, "Little Ralphie" (1932–1993)
Anthony Scotto, "Tony" (born 1934)
Anthony Senter (born 1955)
Alphonso Sgroia, "The Butcher" (1886–1940)
Joseph Sica, "JS" (1911–1982)
Peter Simone, "Las Vegas Pete" (born 1945)
Michele Sindona, "The Shark" (1920–1986)
Frank Sindone (1928–1980)
Thomas Sinito, "The Chinaman" (1938–1997)
Alphonse Sisca, "Funzie" (born 1942/1946)
Vincent Solano (1923–1992)
Anthony Spero, "Tony", "The Old Man" (1929–2008)
Anthony Spilotro, "Tony the Ant" (1938–1986)
Michael Spilotro, "Micky" (1944–1986)
Victor Spilotro (1935–1997)
Pat Spirito, "Pat the Cat" (1939–1983)
James Squillante,"Jimmy Jerome", "Vincent Squillante" (1919–1960)
Arnold Squitieri, "Zeke", "Bozey", "Sylvester", "Squiggy"
John Stanfa, "The Dour Don", "The Zip" (born 1940)
Johnny Stompanato, "Handsome Harry", "John Steele", "Oscar" (1925–1958)
Anthony Strollo, "Tony Bender" (1899–1962)

T
Martin Taccetta, "Marty" (born 1951)
Michael Taccetta, "Mike T.", "Mad Dog" (born 1947)
Silva Tagliagamba (died 1922)
Enrico Tameleo, "Henry", "The Referee" (1901–1985)
John Tartamella (born Giovanni Tartamella, 1892–1966)
Vincent Teresa, "Fat Vinny" (1930–1990)
Ciro Terranova, "The Artichoke King" (1888–1938)
Vincenzo Terranova, "Vincent", "The Tiger of Harlem" (1886–1922)
Joseph Testa (born 1955)
Philip Testa, "Chicken Man" (1924–1981)
Salvatore Testa, "Salvie", "The Crown Prince of the Philadelphia Mob" (1956–1984)
Frank Tieri, "The Old Man", "Funzi" (born Alfonso Tieri, 1904–1981)
Albert Tocco, "Caesar Tocco" (1929–2005)
Jack Tocco (1927–2014)
William Tocco, "Black Bill" (born Guglielmo Vito Tocco, 1897–1972)
Frank Todaro (1889–1944)
Joseph Todaro Jr., "Big Joe" (born 1945)
Joseph Todaro Sr., "Lead Pipe Joe" (1923–2012)
Salvatore Todaro, "Sam", "Black Sam" (born Agosto Arcangelo, 1885–1929)
Antonio Tomasulo, "Bootsie" (1917–?)
James Torello, "Turk" (1930–1979)
Johnny Torrio, "The Fox", "Papa Johnny", "The Brain", "The Immune" (born Donato Torrio, 1882–1957)
Santo Trafficante Jr., "Louie Santos", "The Old Man" (1914–1987)
Santo Trafficante Sr. (1886–1954)
Carmine Tramunti, "Mr. Gribbs" (1910–1978)
Dominick Trinchera, "Big Trin", "Trinny" (1936–1981)
John Tronolone, "Peanuts" (1910–1991)
Ronnie Trucchio, "One Armed Ronnie" (born 1951)
Matthew Trupiano, "Mike" (1938–1997)
Tony Tursi (1901–1989)
Charles Tuzzo, "Chuckie" (born 1933)

U
Charles Ubriaco (born Camillo Umbriaco, 1867–1916)

V
Joseph Valachi, "Joe", "Joe Cago", "Joe Cargo" (1903–1971)
Rocco Valenti (1895–?)
Umberto Valenti (1891–1922)
Louis Vallario, "Big Lou" (born 1942)
Ernest Varacalli, "Junior" (born 1943)
Paul Vario, "Paulie" (1914–1988)
Gaetano Vastola, "Corky", "The Big Guy" (born 1928)
Anthony Veranis, "Mickey White", "Tony" (1938–1966)
John Vitale (1909–1982)
Salvatore Vitale, "Good Looking Sal", "The Chief" (born 1947)
Alessandro Vollero, "Sandro" (1889–1959)

Y
Frankie Yale, "Frankie Uale" (1893–1928)

Z
John Zancocchio, "Porky" (born 1958)
Ilario Zannino, "Larry Baione" (1920–1996)
Ettore Zappi, "Anthony Russo" (1904–1986)
George Zappola, "Georgie Neck" (born 1960)
Anthony Joseph Zerilli, "Tony Z." (1927–2015)
Joseph Zerilli, "Joe  Z.", "The Old Man (born Giuseppe Zerilli, 1897–1977)
Frank Zito, "Samuel Zaso" "Sammy the seal" (1893–1974)
Anthony Zizzo, "Little Tony" (1934–disappeared 2006)

See also
List of Mafia crime families
List of mobsters by city
List of crime bosses

 
Mobsters
Organized crime-related lists
United States crime-related lists
Italy crime-related lists